Cessnock is an electoral district of the Legislative Assembly in the Australian state of New South Wales in the rural fringe of the Hunter. It is represented by Clayton Barr of the Labor Party. It includes all of City of Cessnock (including Cessnock and Kurri Kurri), part of Singleton Council (including Broke and Belford) and a small part of the City of Lake Macquarie (including Barnsley and West Wallsend).

History
Cessnock was created in 1913, but was abolished in 1920, with the introduction of proportional representation and absorbed into Maitland.  It was recreated in 1927 and included much of the Central Coast until the creation of Gosford in 1950. It has historically been a safe  seat.

At the 2007 election, it encompassed all of City of Cessnock, a small part of the City of Newcastle (including Beresfield and Tarro), a small part of the City of Lake Macquarie (including Barnsley and West Wallsend) and a small part of Singleton Council (including Belford). At the 2013 redistribution it gained Broke, Milbrodale and Wollombi from Upper Hunter and lost Beresfield and Tarro to Wallsend.

Members for Cessnock

Election results

References

Cessnock
Singleton Council
Politics of Newcastle, New South Wales
City of Cessnock
City of Lake Macquarie
Constituencies established in 1913
Constituencies disestablished in 1920
1913 establishments in Australia
1920 disestablishments in Australia
Constituencies established in 1927
1927 establishments in Australia